N Carinae is a single star in the constellation Carina, just to the northeast of the prominent star Canopus. This object has a white hue and is faintly visible to the naked eye with an apparent visual magnitude of 4.35. Based on parallax, it is located at a distance of approximately 1,360 light years from the Sun. It has an absolute magnitude of −3.75, and is drifting further away with a radial velocity of +22.5 km/s.

This object has a stellar classification of A0II, matching a massive bright giant. In the past it had received a class of B9III, which is sometimes still used. The star is 37 million years old with 7.9 times the mass of the Sun. It is spinning with a projected rotational velocity of 47 km/s. N Carinae is radiating 3,411 times the luminosity of the Sun from its photosphere at an effective temperature of 8,004 K.

References 

A-type bright giants
Carinae, N
Carina (constellation)
Durchmusterung objects
047306
031407
2435